Saipeta is a village in Kondapuram mandal in Sri Potti Sriramulu Nellore district on the East Coast of India in the state of Andhra Pradesh.

References

Villages in Nellore district